The protected areas of Bhutan are its national parks, nature preserves, and wildlife sanctuaries. Most of these protected areas were first set aside in the 1960s, originally covering most of the northern and southern regions of Bhutan. Today, protected areas cover more than 42% of the kingdom, mostly in the northern regions. Protected areas also line most of Bhutan's international borders with China and India.

Background

The Forest and Nature Conservation Act of Bhutan, 1995 is the primary legislation that provides a framework of protected areas for Bhutan. The Act defines a protected area as an area, which has been declared to be a national park, conservation area, wildlife sanctuary, wildlife reserve, nature reserve, strict nature reserve, research forest, critical watershed or other protected areas.
The government agency responsible for the oversight of protected areas is the Ministry of Agriculture, Forestry Services Division. Since 1992, protected areas have been managed by the Bhutan Trust Fund for Environmental Conservation. In 1993, the Fund revised and reduced its extensive parks system for better ecological representation and management. Through 2008, however, protected areas expanded significantly with the establishment of Wangchuck Centennial National Park, spanning a  swath in northern Bhutan. The parks and sanctuaries are all connected either directly or by "biological corridors." As of 2011, the Fund had recruited 189 field staff, had trained 24 post-graduate specialists, and had provided over 300 short scientific courses. The Fund alone manages a total protected area of  – nearly the size of Switzerland and more than 42 percent of Bhutan's total . With the exception of Phibsoo Wildlife Sanctuary and Jigme Khesar Strict Nature Reserve, these protected areas are inhabited or are located within populated areas.

In practice, the overlap of these extensive protected lands with populated areas has led to mutual habitat encroachment. The Lateral Road, Bhutan's main highway, bisects Phrumsengla National Park in the centre of the kingdom. Protected wildlife has entered agricultural areas, trampling crops and killing livestock. In response, Bhutan has implemented an insurance scheme, begun constructing solar powered alarm fences, watch towers, and search lights, and has provided fodder and salt licks outside human settlement areas to encourage animals to stay away.

List of protected areas
Below is a list of the ten protected areas of Bhutan maintained by the Trust Fund:
 Bumdeling Wildlife Sanctuary (Lhuntse, Mongar, and Trashiyangtse Districts; contains the former Kulong Chu Wildlife Sanctuary)
 Jigme Dorji National Park (Gasa, Paro, Punakha, Thimphu, and Wangdue Phodrang Districts)
 Jigme Singye Wangchuck National Park (Sarpang, Tsirang, Trongsa, Wangdue Phodrang, and Zhemgang Districts)
 Jomotsangkha Wildlife Sanctuary (Samdrup Jongkhar District)
 Phibsoo Wildlife Sanctuary (Dagana and Sarpang Districts)
 Royal Manas National Park (Pemagatshel, Sarpang, and Zhemgang Districts)
 Sakteng Wildlife Sanctuary (Trashigang and Samdrup Jongkhar Districts)
 Phrumsengla National Park (Bumthang, Lhuntse, Mongar, and Zhemgang Districts)
 Jigme Khesar Strict Nature Reserve (Haa District)
 Wangchuck Centennial National Park (Bumthang, Gasa, Lhuntse, Trongsa, and Wangdue Phodrang Districts)

In addition, the Royal Government maintains the following protected areas: 
 Motithang Takin Preserve (Thimphu District)

The following areas of Bhutan are protected or maintained by private organizations:
 Phobjikha Valley (Royal Society for Protection of Nature)

See also
Environmental issues in Bhutan
Royal Society for the Protection of Nature (RSPN)
List of Hot Springs and Mineral Springs of Bhutan

References

External links

 
Bhutan
Protected areas